Shawn Craig (born 23 June 1973) is an Australian former first-class cricketer, who is now an umpire.

Playing career
Craig played first-class cricket for the Victorian Bushrangers, debuting in 1996–97 after graduating from the Australian Cricket Academy. He was used for his part-time legspin and his middle-order batting. His finest knock with the bat was an unbeaten 128 in 1998–99.

In his first-class career he averaged 31 with Victoria over the space of 20 matches, and was cut from the state squad after the 2001–02 season. Following this he became a prominent all-rounder in Victorian Premier Cricket, opening the batting for St Kilda Cricket Club.

Umpiring career
Craig is a member of the Cricket Australia Project Panel and officiates at First Grade level in Victorian Premier Cricket.

See also
 List of Victoria first-class cricketers
 List of Twenty20 International cricket umpires

References

External links

1973 births
Living people
Australian cricketers
Australian cricket umpires
Australian Twenty20 International cricket umpires
Cricketers from Melbourne
Victoria cricketers
People from Carlton, Victoria